John Gilbert Cock MM MID (14 November 1893 – 19 April 1966) was an English footballer who played for various English club sides as a centre forward. He also had the distinction of being the first Cornishman to play for the England national team, a decorated World War I soldier, and an actor. His younger brothers, Donald Cock and Herbert Cock, also played professional football.

Playing career
Born in Hayle, he started his football career with amateur clubs West Kensington United, Forest Gate and Old Kingstonians. He played three Southern League Division Two matches in March 1914 as an amateur for Brentford, scoring one goal, before signing professional forms with Yorkshire side Huddersfield Town later that year, though the First World War broke out shortly afterwards. He served in the British Army during the conflict, rising to the rank of Acting Sergeant-Major and earning the Military Medal for "Bravery in the Field" and a Mentioned in Despatches for "gallantry". He was reported as 'missing, presumed dead' at one point during the war. During his breaks from military service, he turned out for London sides Brentford and Croydon Common. While with Brentford, Cock scored six hattricks, a wartime record he shares with Len Townsend. Cock also played for England in the Victory International in 1919.

With the resumption of league football in 1919, he moved back to Huddersfield who, at the time, were in severe financial trouble. Cock was sold to David Calderhead's Chelsea for a record £2,500 in October that year. A skilful, nimble striker with a powerful shot, he had a fanatical dedication to fitness, often staying behind to train long after his teammates had gone home. He scored twice on his Chelsea debut against Bradford and hit 22 more that season in 30 league games, a key factor in the club finishing third in the League and reaching the FA Cup semi-finals.

Cock's first season with the Stamford Bridge club proved to be his most successful, and thereafter his goalscoring record was never as prolific, though he was still top scorer at the club in 1920–21 and 1921–22. After scoring one goal in 11 appearances in 1922–23, he was transferred to Everton in February 1923. He ended his Chelsea career with a nonetheless impressive 53 goals from 110 games. Cock remained on Merseyside for two years, before signing for Plymouth Argyle in March 1925, where he scored 72 League goals in just 90 games, including a club record 32 goals in 39 League games in 1926–27. However, the club finished 2nd in the Third Division South in each of his three seasons there and thus missed out on promotion. His playing career ended on a high note, though, when he moved to Millwall and scored 92 goals in 135 appearances, helping the club win the Division Three South title in 1927–28. His 77 League goals there remained a club record until 1973. He is currently Millwall's fourth all-time leading scorer, with 83 goals in all competitions.

Cock ended his first class playing career with 234 Football League goals from 391 matches. He wound down playing for non-league sides such as Folkestone and Walton & Hersham. He managed Millwall between 1944 and 1948, leading them to the War Cup South final at Wembley in 1945, where they lost to his old side Chelsea. The club's playing squad was hit hard by World War II and they were relegated at the end of the 1947–48 season; he left the job shortly afterwards.

He made his England debut against Ireland in 1919, and opened the scoring after 30 seconds, which is currently the third-fastest timed England goal of all time. He won a second (and final) cap against Scotland in 1920, again scoring.

Owing to his good looks and a tenor voice, Cock appeared on the music hall stage numerous times (during his playing days, he was known for singing before entering the pitch). He also starred in several films, including "The Winning Goal" (1920) and "The Great Game" (1930). He later ran a pub in New Cross. He died in Kensington on 19 April 1966, at the age of 72.

Honours 
Brentford
 London Combination: 1918–19

See also
List of solved missing person cases

References

1893 births
1910s missing person cases
1966 deaths
People from Hayle
Footballers from Cornwall
Association football forwards
English footballers
England international footballers
England wartime international footballers
Brentford F.C. players
Brentford F.C. wartime guest players
Chelsea F.C. players
Croydon Common F.C. players
Everton F.C. players
Huddersfield Town A.F.C. players
Millwall F.C. players
Plymouth Argyle F.C. players
Walton & Hersham F.C. players
English football managers
Millwall F.C. managers
British Army personnel of World War I
Recipients of the Distinguished Conduct Medal
Recipients of the Military Medal
Middlesex Regiment soldiers
Folkestone F.C. players
English Football League players
English Football League representative players
Missing in action of World War I
Formerly missing people
Military personnel from Cornwall